Fox is an unincorporated community in Grayson County, Virginia, United States located at the intersection of U.S. Route 58 (Wilson Highway) and State Route 711 (Fox Creek Road and Maple Road).

Fox has a cemetery, the Fox Union Cemetery, located on Fox Creek Road.

Geography
It is north of the New River and west of Fox Creek.

References

Unincorporated communities in Virginia
Unincorporated communities in Grayson County, Virginia